Sarva Dharma Sama Bhava is a concept coined by Mahatma Gandhi that embodies the equality of the destination of the paths followed by all religions.

The concept was originally observed by Sri Rāmakrishṇa and Swāmi Vivekānanda, but was popularized by Mahātmā Gāndhi. Although originally occurring among the ancient Hindu Vedas, the phrase was eventually attributed to Gandhi, who first used it in September 1930 in his communications to his followers to quell divisions that had begun to develop between Hindus and Muslims.

The concept is one of the key tenets of secularism in India, which do not separate church and state, but instead is an attempt by the state to embrace all religions.

Sarva dharma sama bhav is often translated as "All religions are the same" or "All path's lead to the same destination [In a religious sense]", although its literal meaning is closer to "All dharma/faiths are possible".

See also
 Comparative religion
 Hindu–Christianity relations 
 Hindu–Islamic relations
 Hinduism and Judaism
 Ganga-Jamuni tehzeeb
 Unity in diversity
 Religious syncretism
 Hindutva
 We Are the World

References

External links
 Sarva Dharma Samabhãva or Sarva Dharma Sambhrama? Essay by David Frawley (Prajna: A Journal of Indian Resurgence, January–March, 1997)

Hindu philosophical concepts